Building life cycle refers to the view of a building over the course of its entire life, viewing it not just as an operational building, but taking into account the design, construction, operation, demolition and waste treatment. The study of the entire impact of a building on its environment has become a de facto requirement for construction in most jurisdictions, owing to the resource-intensive nature of construction. Life cycle analysis considers various aspects of resource utilization in a building, for example, overall energy conservation. Current research is focused on exploring methods of incorporating a whole life cycle view of buildings. It is considered a subset of life-cycle analysis.

History

The concept of life cycle analysis evolved since the concept was initially considered in the 1970s and 1980s, when life cycle studies focused on the quantifying the energy and raw resources used by a building, and the load on the sewerage and sanitation systems imposed by waste generated in the building, during the operational life of the structure. Since then, the methods of analysis has evolved, and presently comprises four stages - definition of scope, inventory analysis and life cycle impact assessment. In the period from 2000 to 2014, studies on sustainable building strategies, for example, energy consumption, specific components of construction, materials, environmental impacts of building subsystems, integrated renewable energy systems, and electrical and thermal systems have been conducted, with the number of publications rising monotonically.

See also
 Life cycle analysis

References

Sustainable building
Industrial ecology
Environmental impact assessment